Estorre Visconti, or Astorre according to other sources (13467 January 1413), was one of the many illegitimate sons of the famous Bernabò Visconti, Lord of Milan and already deposed by his nephew Gian Galeazzo Visconti in 1385.

Biography
Born in Milan, son of Barnabò and Beltramola de' Grassi, Estorre in 1404 had received as its domain the Lordship of Martinengo and Morengo. He was a member of the Society of Braid, chivalric order founded Archduke Albert III of Austria.

Giovanni Maria Visconti, son of Gian Galeazzo and Duke of Milan, and accused him of conspiracy and had him close in the terrible prison of Ovens in the Castle of Monza, from which he was freed by his followers of the Ghibelline party.

In 1407 he was proclaimed Lord of Monza and made a mint to mint its own coins with the words Hestor Vicecomes Modoetie.

At the killing of Giovanni Maria Visconti (16 May 1412), Duke Estorre was acclaimed by the people of Milan, and remained so until June of that year. In fact defeated by Filippo Maria Visconti, brother of Giovanni Maria; Estorre, his sister Valentina and the husband Giovanni Aliprandi, fled to Monza where he was besieged by the Count of Carmagnola. Here, in the courtyard of the castle, while he was watering his horse, a stone thrown at random from a catapult of the besiegers broke his leg causing death in Monza after a few days.

In 1711, following the work in the Duomo of Monza, his mummified body was found and is now preserved in the Museum. His sword, a valuable work of the Milanese armourer, is exhibited in the Museum of the Treasure of the Cathedral of Monza.

References

Estorre
People from Monza
People from Brianza
1346 births
1413 deaths
Mummies